The West Penn Conference (WPC) was an intercollegiate athletic conference that operated from 1958 to 1969. Its members were located in Western Pennsylvania and included the Carnegie Institute of Technology—now known as Carnegie Mellon University—in Pittsburgh, Duquesne University in Pittsburgh, Geneva College in Beaver Falls, Grove City College in Grove City, Saint Francis University in Loretto, Saint Vincent College in Latrobe, Waynesburg College—now known as Waynesburg University—in Waynesburg, and Westminster College in New Wilmington.

Football champions
 1958 – 
 1959 – 
 1960 – 
 1961 – 
 1962 – 
 1963 –  and 
 1964 – 
 1965 – 
 1966 – Waynesburg
 1967 – 
 1968 –

See also
 List of defunct college football conferences

References

 
1958 establishments in Pennsylvania
1969 disestablishments in Pennsylvania